The 2015–16 Riksserien season was the ninth season of the Swedish Women's Hockey League. The season began in September 2015 and ended in March 2016. It was the last season the league was known under the Riksserien name, changing to Svenska damhockeyligan (SDHL) the following year.

League business  
The fee for carrying international players on team rosters was set at 3500kr per player for the season.

In November 2015, two members of the far-right Sweden Democrats party proposed a motion in the Riksdag calling on the government to discuss financial support for women's hockey in Sweden.

Significant events

Pre-season  
For the 2015-16 season, the league expanded from eight to ten teams, with both HV71 and Djurgårdens IF joining the league. After facing financial difficulties, Munksund-Skuthamns SK merged with Luleå HF to form Luleå HF/MSSK.

In North America, the National Women's Hockey League was formed as the first professional women's hockey league to pay all of its players a salary. Many Swedish players chose to remain in Sweden and in Riksserien, however.

Regular season 
The regular season began on the 9th of September 2015.

A Sundsvall-Modo match in late November 2015 was marked with controversy after three Sundsvall players were forced to leave the game after suffering concussions, including Canadian forward Danielle Stone. Sundsvall head coach Lars Johansson stated that he had "never experienced anything like this."

25 games into the season, Djurgården forward Andrea Dalen scored two goals to lift her season total to 34, breaking Josefine Jakobsen's record for most goals scored in a single riksserien. She would finish the year with 47 goals, a record that still stands.

In January 2016, defender Nathalie Lidman made her Riksserien debut for Luleå at the age of 14, one of the youngest players in league history to make her debut.

After Luleå star Emma Nordin injured herself while on international duty just before the playoffs, the organised a fundraising efforts to be able to afford the transfer fee to fill her spot on the roster. The club was able to raise over 50,000kr, with Swedish men's international Dick Axelsson among the notable contributors.

Playoffs 
Before the start of the finals series, Linköping HC was forced to fundraise as the club's women's side lacked the budget to pay for flights to Luleå and accommodation. The club was able to collect over 20,000kr via fundraising.

Luleå HF/MSSK won the championship playoffs in their first season as a club, defeating Linköping HC 2 games to 1. The final games of the finals set a Riksserien record for attendance, with 4179 spectators present at the Coop Norrbotten Arena in Luleå.

Post-season 
After losing in the finals, Linköping HC discovered that their plane tickets back from Luleå had gone missing, with head coach Peter Frantz deeming it "sabotage". After a short investigation it turned out that the club had simply forgotten to book the tickets. Frantz ended up paying for new tickets out of his own pocket at the women's team didn't have enough money left in its budget.

In April 2016, Emma Eliasson was named Riksserien Defender of the Year and was named Swedish Hockey Girl of the Year. After receiving the award, she called on the Swedish Ice Hockey Federation to change the name of the award to something less outdated.

Standings   
Each team played 36 regular season games, with three points being awarded for winning in regulation time, two points for winning in overtime or shootout, one point for losing in overtime or shootout, and zero points for losing in regulation time. At the end of the regular season, the team that finishes with the most points is crowned the league champion.

Regular season

See also 
 Women's ice hockey in Sweden

References

External links 
 League website
 Official season statistics from the Swedish Ice Hockey Association

SDHL
2015–16 in European ice hockey leagues
Women's ice hockey competitions in Sweden
Swedish Women's Hockey League seasons